Hakim Karimovich Zaripov (variously Zaripov Khakim Karimovich; 17 September 1924 – 18 January 2023) was a Soviet and Uzbek circus performer, trick rider, and horse trainer.

Early life
Zaripov was born on 17 September 1924 in Tashkent, Turkestan ASSR, Soviet Union. His father was Karim Zaripov, an equestrian, humorist, and founder of the show Uzbekistan Vigitlari (Uzbekistan Lads). Zaripov's mother Zaripova Muborak was an equestrian and the first female Uzbek clown.

Career
Zaripov studied music at the R. Glier Kyiv Institute of Music before beginning his circus career on 23 February 1937. He was part of the Zaripov family dynasty which has been performing in circuses for more than one hundred years.

At the time of his death, Zaripov was the head of a new Uzbekistan Vigitlari group. He trained and performed with horses for circus shows and mentored students, many of whom have gone on to enjoy circus careers. One year, Zaripov played the role of Temur for Ulugh Beg's anniversary.

Awards
Zaripov has been given the following awards:
1954: Honored Artist of the Uzbek SSR
1964: People's Artist of the Uzbek SSR
1980: People's Artist of the USSR

Personal life and death
Zaripov was married to Nina Dmitriyevna Zaripova, a ballet dancer. Zaripov has a sister, Kholida Zaripova, two daughters, Gavhar and Anvar Zaripova, and three grandchildren, Karima, Erkin, and Igor Zaripova.

Zaripov died on 18 January 2023, at the age of 98.

References

1924 births
2023 deaths
20th-century circus performers
20th-century Uzbekistani male actors
People from Tashkent
People's Artists of the USSR
Soviet circus performers
Soviet educators
Soviet male actors
Uzbekistani educators
Uzbekistani entertainers
Uzbekistani male actors